Only the Brave is a 2017 American biographical drama film directed by Joseph Kosinski, and written by Ken Nolan and Eric Warren Singer, based on the GQ article "No Exit" by Sean Flynn. The film tells the story of the Granite Mountain Hotshots, an elite crew of firefighters from Prescott, Arizona who lost 19 of 20 members while fighting the Yarnell Hill Fire in June 2013, and is dedicated to their memory. It features an ensemble cast, including Josh Brolin, James Badge Dale, Jeff Bridges, Miles Teller, Alex Russell, Taylor Kitsch, Ben Hardy, Thad Luckinbill, Geoff Stults, Scott Haze, Andie MacDowell, and Jennifer Connelly.

Principal photography began in New Mexico in June 2016. Only the Brave was released by Columbia Pictures in North America and by Summit Entertainment in other territories on October 20, 2017. The film was a box-office bomb, grossing just $26.3 million worldwide against a $38 million budget. However, it received positive reviews, with praise for the cast and the film's touching tribute to its subjects. The film is dedicated to the Granite Mountain Hotshots and their families.

Plot 

Eric Marsh, superintendent of Fire and Rescue Crew 7 in Prescott, Arizona, receives a call to a wildfire. Due to Crew 7's status as municipal firefighters, Eric's prediction that the fire will threaten a nearby neighborhood is ignored by a hotshot crew from California. The fire behaves as Eric anticipated, and the neighborhood is destroyed. Eric speaks to fire chief Duane Steinbrink regarding his desire for Crew 7 to become certified hotshots. Duane warns that no other municipal crew in the country has that status and they will have to commit to a longer working season. This frustrates Eric's wife Amanda, who resents how the time commitment already keeps Eric from wanting to start a family.

Brendan McDonough is unemployed and abuses drugs. His ex-girlfriend Natalie is pregnant with his baby, but she feels that he is too irresponsible to be in her life. When he is arrested for larceny, his mother kicks him out of the house. When his daughter is born, he wants to provide for her, so he interviews with Eric, who hires him despite the reservations of some of the crew.

The crew trains hard and is finally deployed to a wildfire for evaluation. They pass and become the Granite Mountain Hotshots. Natalie begins to accept Brendan and lets him spend time with their daughter.

The crew fights several fires, including saving a historic juniper tree where Brendan is bitten by a rattlesnake while walking a fire line. The crew become local heroes. While he recovers in the hospital, Brendan's mother suggests that he should reconsider his career for his daughter's sake. Brendan later approaches Eric about transferring to a structural firefighting crew. Eric snaps, suggesting that Brendan’s criminal past makes a transfer nearly impossible, and that he will return to drugs without the purpose being a hotshot provides. Eric, a recovering addict himself, argues with Amanda about his attitude towards Brendan's sense of priorities, and his reluctance to start a family. Eric has a heartfelt talk with Duane and returns home to tell Amanda he's ready to start a family.

The Granite Mountain Hotshots are called to the next wildfire. Traveling to the area, Eric tells his second-in-command Jesse that he will be stepping down and will appoint Jesse as the superintendent in the near future. Walking into the fire zone, Eric apologizes to Brendan for snapping at him. Eric tells Brendan that he will help him secure a transfer so that he can spend more time with his family. The crew begins a counterattack to contain the fire, but an air tanker mistakes it for a secondary fire, and extinguishes it. The crew now has to relocate, so Eric sends Brendan to higher ground as a lookout. When the wind suddenly intensifies and shifts, Brendan is rescued by another hotshot crew, and they evacuate to the mobile headquarters. The rest of the crew head to a safe zone after realizing that the fast-moving fire is too intense.

The fire picks up speed and jumps the safe zone, continuing towards the crew and cutting off their escape route. The crew clears a small site, and Eric calls in an air tanker to douse the rapidly advancing fire front. The tanker misses the crew, and they deploy their compact personal fire shelters. As the fire sweeps over the crew, multiple radio calls go unanswered. Brendan hears the radio call from the first helicopter to reach the site: all 19 crew members are confirmed dead.

The devastated families of the hotshots gather at Prescott Middle School, where they hear reports of a lone survivor of the twenty firefighters. Brendan insists that he should be taken to the school and enters the gymnasium. Upon seeing Brendan, knowing that he was one of the hotshots, they realize that he is the only one who survived, and that their loved ones have perished. As they grieve, Brendan storms out of the gym and has a psychological breakdown due to survivors guilt, and Amanda consoles him.

Three years later, Brendan takes his daughter to the juniper tree that was saved by the crew. During the closing credits, photos are shown of the actual Granite Mountain Hotshots and their actor counterparts.

Cast

Production 
On March 1, 2016, Josh Brolin and Miles Teller joined the cast of the film. Jeff Bridges and Taylor Kitsch later also joined the cast. The film was produced under the working title Granite Mountain. Principal photography on the film began in New Mexico on June 13, 2016. Filming took place at different locations in and around Santa Fe and Los Alamos.

Joseph Trapanese composed the film's score. Dierks Bentley released a single called "Hold The Light", featuring S. Carey. The single and the music video was released on October 6, 2017.

Release 
Only the Brave, originally titled Granite Mountain, was released on October 20, 2017, by Sony Pictures Releasing under its Columbia Pictures label. Before that the film was set a release date for September 22, 2017, but a disagreement between Lionsgate and production company Black Label Media saw the U.S. distribution rights change to Columbia Pictures. Summit Entertainment will retain international rights in select countries for the film. The trailer came out on July 19, and the film was retitled Only the Brave. The film was released digitally on January 23, 2018, and on DVD and Blu-ray on February 6, 2018. As of December 2018, it had made $7.2 million in home video sales.

Reception

Box office
Only the Brave grossed $18.3 million in the United States and Canada, and $7.4 million in other territories, for a worldwide total of $25.8 million, against a production budget of $38 million.

In the United States and Canada, Only the Brave was released alongside Boo 2! A Madea Halloween, The Snowman and Geostorm, and was expected to gross around $7 million from 2,575 theaters in its opening weekend. It made $305,000 from Thursday night previews and $2.1 million on its first day. It ended up debuting to $6 million, finishing 5th at the box office. In its second week the film dropped 42.5% to $3.4 million, finishing 7th.

Critical response 
On review aggregator Rotten Tomatoes, the film has an approval rating of 87% based on 160 reviews, with an average rating of 7.09/10. The website's critical consensus reads, "Only the Braves impressive veteran cast and affecting fact-based story add up to a no-frills drama that's just as stolidly powerful as the real-life heroes it honors." On Metacritic, which assigns a weighted average rating to reviews, the film has a weighted average score of 72 out of 100, based on 35 critics, indicating "generally favorable reviews". Audiences polled by CinemaScore gave the film an average grade of "A" on an A+ to F scale.

Bilge Ebiri of Village Voice wrote, "Only the Brave is a visually splendid, spellbinding, and surreal movie that also happens to be an emotionally shattering, over-the-top ugly-cry for the ages." Todd McCarthy of The Hollywood Reporter called the film "an engaging account of a tragic real-life story."

Richard Roeper of the Chicago Sun-Times gave the film 3.5 out of 4 stars, saying: "The blending of practical effects and CGI is impressive, and we come to understand the risks these men are taking, but some of the techniques and approaches they take remain a mystery, up to and through the climactic fire. Not that we need a manual to understand these men were working-class, everyday heroes." Scott Menzel of We Live Entertainment also praised the film, saying, "Only the Brave is without question the best firefighter film since Backdraft and one that pays tribute to the brave men that sacrificed their own lives to protect thousands of others."

Richard Brody noted in The New Yorker that "Only the Brave ties the characters’ private lives to their work lives in a plethora of details, but it never looks beyond the work life into life at large, or even into the life that surrounds them in their own home town." Brody described the film as a missed opportunity to depict those who battled local politicians to secure benefits for survivors of the Yarnell Hill Fire and the widows of the deceased Hotshots. The review quoted Fernanda Santos in The New York Times who wrote that "Juliann Ashcraft decided to leave Prescott altogether to spare her four children the discomfort of whispers and glares" — a reference to the harassment of women who challenged the decision to treat victims differently based on their employment status.

Accolades

References

External links 
 
 
 
 

2017 films
2017 drama films
2017 biographical drama films
American biographical drama films
Black Label Media films
Columbia Pictures films
Di Bonaventura Pictures films
Drama films based on actual events
Films about firefighting
Films about wildfires
Films based on newspaper and magazine articles
Films directed by Joseph Kosinski
Films produced by Lorenzo di Bonaventura
Films scored by Joseph Trapanese
Films set in 2013
Films set in Prescott, Arizona
Films shot in New Mexico
Films with screenplays by Ken Nolan
Lionsgate films
Summit Entertainment films
2010s English-language films
2010s American films